Enrico Lacruz (born 31 August 1993) is a Dutch boxer. He competed in the men's lightweight event at the 2016 Summer Olympics. He defeated Lai Chu-en of Chinese Taipei in his first fight before losing to Dorjnyambuugiin Otgondalai of Mongolia.

In 2016, prior to the Rio 2016 Olympics, Enrico Lacruz won a gold medal in the Eindhoven Box Cup 2016 in the Netherlands. In the quarterfinals he won against Yasin Yilmaz (Turkey) by unanimous decision. The semi-finals he saw another unanimous win over Igor Lazarev (Israel). In the final La Cruz won his third straight unanimous decision in this tournament over Uganda's national champion Sula Segawa.

References

External links
 

1993 births
Living people
Lightweight boxers
Dutch male boxers
Olympic boxers of the Netherlands
Boxers at the 2016 Summer Olympics
Sportspeople from Arnhem
Boxers at the 2019 European Games
European Games medalists in boxing
European Games bronze medalists for the Netherlands
Boxers at the 2020 Summer Olympics
21st-century Dutch people